NFSM may refer to:
 National Food Security Mission
 Nondeterministic finite state machine (also abbreviated NDFSM)